The Heinkel HD 55 was a biplane flying boat produced in Germany in the early 1930s for use as a reconnaissance aircraft aboard Soviet warships. The design was based on the HD 15 mail plane of 1927 and was a conventional design for its time, with equal span, unstaggered wings, and an engine mounted tractor-wise on struts above the pilot's open cockpit. A second open cockpit was added on the rear fuselage to provide a position for a tail gunner.

In Soviet service, the designation KR-1 was used (корабельный разведчик - Korabelniy Razvedchik - "Shipboard Reconnaissance").

The first catapult was installed on the battleship Parizhskaya Kommuna in October 1930, and trials commenced immediately, revealing problems with both the catapult and the aircraft. These difficulties were never fully resolved, and the KR-1 was plagued through its career by various structural defects. The type lingered on in service well into obsolescence in the mid-1930s, mostly due to the failure of its intended replacement, the Beriev Be-2. The final operational use of the KR-1 was around 1938, and by 1941 all had been either scrapped or placed in indefinite storage.

Operators

Soviet Naval Aviation

Specifications

References

 

1920s German military reconnaissance aircraft
Flying boats
HD 55
Biplanes
Single-engined tractor aircraft
Aircraft first flown in 1929